Celastrina cardia, the pale hedge blue, is a small butterfly found in India that belongs to the lycaenids or blues family.

Taxonomy
The butterfly was earlier known as Lycaenopsis cardia Moore.

Range
It is found in Shimla in India to the Karen Hills in Myanmar.

See also
List of butterflies of India
List of butterflies of India (Lycaenidae)

References

Sources
 
 

Celastrina
Butterflies of Asia
Butterflies described in 1860